The 1977 Can Am season was the tenth running of the Sports Car Club of America's prototype-based series. Despite the revived name, however, the new series was entirely unrelated to the previous series which had folded in 1974. Most of the competitive cars were based on Formula 5000 chassis. Also, the first time under 2-litre cars were allowed to race, but with no separate class.  Patrick Tambay was declared champion, winning six of the nine races that year for Carl Haas. While Lola chassis dominated the series, a Chevrolet powered Schkee DB1 driven by Tom Klausler won the first race at Mont Tremblant. Other competitive cars included the 1974 champions Shadow, who now used Dodge engines and Wolf with a Dallara-built chassis. While Chevrolet was not the only engine supplier, they swept the entire season. This season also marked a resurgence of interest in SCCA events, with Can Am accompanying F5000 and the Trans Am Series seeing a mild resurgence in the eighties.

Formula 5000 itself would also be classified as "single-seat Can Am", despite two-seater cars also entering the series.

Results

References

Can-Am seasons
1977 in motorsport
1977 in American motorsport
1977 in Canadian motorsport